Zibagwe Rural District Council is a rural local government arm in Kwekwe District created under the Rural District Councils Act: Chapter 20.13. It was formed from the amalgamation of the former Kwekwe Rural Council and the Mashambazhou District Council in 1993. An RDC is the administrative equivalent of an urban town council, but for a rural area.

Background

There are 60 rural district councils from Zimbabwe's eight non-metropolitan provinces. Midlands Province has eight rural district councils, including Zibagwe RDC.

The district is subdivided into 33 wards, and the registered villagers in each ward elect a councillor to represent them at the district level in the Rural District Council (RDC).

A district is administered by both the district administrator (DA) and the council (RDC). The DA exerts considerable influence within council. He is a senior civil servant employed according to the Public Service Commission regulations. He attends council meetings as a non-voting observer and adviser. Unlike councillors, the DA has significant powers outside the council, in as much that he is involved in the appointment of chiefs.

The Rural District Council is the only democratic rural local governance body at the district level. Its members are elected as provided by the constitution (2013 Constitution section 275.2.b) and all so elected from each ward form a rural district council which is the equivalent of the urban town council.

Each elected councillor chairs the Ward Development Committee (WADCO or WDC) at ward level. Other members of the WADCO are locally appointed from committee members of village development committees (VIDCO).

The CEO is appointed by the RDC and approved by the minister, or the minister might do both. The CEO exerts significant authority and even administers the oath of office for councillors and keeps the minutes of meetings. He is a senior staff member permanently employed by the council unlike his counterparts, whose terms of office cease just before the next elections; usually theirs are five-year terms.

Leadership
Chief Executive Officer (CEO):
 Farai Machaya 
(not to be confused with the Midlands Governor's son)

Chairman 2013–2018:
 Clr Chamunogwa Andersen Zvishamira (Ward 32)

Vice-Chairman 2013–2018:
 Clr Jason Deetlefs (Ward 21)

Zibagwe RDC (2013–2018)

|SEE 2013_Local Authorities Election Results | External Link

Constituencies covered

Churumanzu-Zibagwe has only three wards in this rural district. Most of its wards are in Takawira Rural District Council.

See also
 Kwekwe District
 Kwekwe
 Redcliff
 Silobela
 Zhombe
 Zhombe Constituency

Zibagwe RDC (2008–2013)

References

Districts of Midlands Province